Herbert v. Shanley Co., 242 U.S. 591 (1917), was a United States Supreme Court case in which the Court held hotels and restaurants that perform music must compensate composers, even if the venue is not separately charging patrons to hear the music.

The decision legitimized ASCAP, a group founded to collect license fees from businesses that wanted to play performance recordings by its members.

Because this case determined that playing music at the restaurants was an indirect way of profiting from the copyrighted music, it raised the question of what sort of indirect use would be too indirect to constitute infringement. Broadly speaking, this question was not anticipated by the Copyright Act and judges considered this a thorny problem. Nevertheless, courts made decisions indicating that commercial radio broadcasts and uses in advertising were sufficiently direct.

References

External links
 

1917 in United States case law
United States copyright case law
United States Supreme Court cases
United States Supreme Court cases of the White Court